The Pakistan cricket team played against South Africa in UAE from 26 October to 24 November 2010. The tour was originally scheduled to consist of one Twenty20 (T20), five One Day Internationals (ODIs) and two Tests, but due to the 2010 Pakistan floods, South Africa proposed to play another T20 to raise funds for flood victims.

On 7 October, Pakistan announced their 15-men squad marking the return of Misbah-ul-Haq but no captain was announced (despite the fact that Shahid Afridi has been their limited-overs captain since June that year). A day later, Misbah-ul-Haq was named as the Test captain, while Shahid Afridi was retained as limited-overs captain.

South African captain Graeme Smith announced that despite the controversies surrounding the Pakistan cricket team relating to the spot-fixing scandal, it was important to focus on the series so that the team can prepare for the World Cup.

After much media speculations, it was announced that the Umpire Decision Review System would not be used for the Test series. The Pakistan Cricket Board stated that the media contracts it had signed earlier do not cover UDRS, therefore it would not be used in any of Pakistan's home matches until at least 2012.

Squads

Twenty20

1st T20I

2nd T20I

ODI series

1st ODI

2nd ODI

3rd ODI

4th ODI

5th ODI

Test Series

1st Test

2nd Test

Media coverage

Television
Ten Sports : India, Sri Lanka and Pakistan
Pakistan Television : Pakistan
Eurosport : England
Setanta Sports Australia : Australia
ARY Digital : Europe, UAE and Pakistan
SuperSport : South Africa, Kenya, Zimbabwe
Zee Sports : USA
CBN-ATN : Canada

References

External links
 Pakistan v South Africa from Cricinfo

2010 in Pakistani cricket
2010 in South African cricket
2010 in Emirati cricket
Cricket in the United Arab Emirates
International cricket competitions in 2010–11
Pakistani cricket seasons from 2000–01
2010